Ludvig Holberg, the "Molière of the North", wrote 33 Danish comedies between 1722 and 1753 — 15 of them ("the foundation for the entire Danish theatre") in a span of less than 18 months in 1722 and early 1723.

In his long career, nominally in education, Holberg produced works in philosophy, law, finance, and history; essays, satirical verse, biographies, memoirs, and an early science fiction utopia. However, his comedies have brought him the widest and most lasting acclaim. Despite this, no English translations of Holberg's comedies were made during his lifetime, and only 4 in the 19th century. In the 20th century many translations appeared (including 14 published by The American-Scandinavian Foundation). Now at least 39 English translations are available representing 20 of Holberg's 33 comedies. Jeppe on the Hill — his "most popular and most discussed play" — is also the most frequently translated, followed by Erasmus Montanus.

Translations

Key

 Danish Title — The original play that serves as the basis of the English text.
 English Title — The title of the English text, as it appears in the given translation. Because one Danish title may be published under various English titles, sorting by this column is not a reliable way to group all translations of a particular original together; to do so, sort on Danish Title.
 Year — The year of the translation's first publication. Some translations may have been written or produced earlier than this date, and some have been republished subsequently, but this is not noted here.
 Publication — The publication in which the translation first appeared. These short titles are linked to their full bibliographic entries.

Table

Notes

English translations

Drama collections

Individual dramas

Other works

References
 
 
 
 

18th-century plays
Plays by Ludvig Holberg
Translations into English
Lists of plays
Translation-related lists